The Chik are a Muslim community, found in the states of Bihar and Uttar Pradesh in India. They are also known as Bakar Qasab, Buz Qassab and Chikwa. The Chik have been granted Other Backward Class status in both Bihar and Uttar Pradesh.

Origin

The Chik are traditionally involved in the slaughter and selling of goat meat. They claim descent from Qureshi Arabs, who are said to have arrived in India in the early Middle Ages.Most of them are converted from Hindu Chikwa Tribe.The Chik are a sub-group within the larger Qassab community of South Asia. They specialize in the slaughtering of goats, while the Qassab are involved in the slaughtering of buffaloes. In Uttar Pradesh, the Chik are often referred to as Bakar Qassab or Buz Kassab.  The word bakar comes from the Urdu word bakra, which means a goat, and bakar qassab literally means a mutton butcher, Their residences are adjacent to them including their business like Meat and leather. The Uttar Pradesh Chik are endogamous, while in Bihar, the Chik  inter marry with the Qassab.

Present circumstances 

The Uttar Pradesh Chik are mainly involved in the business and trade of meat and hides.  While the urban Bakar Qasab purchase goats and sheep from the Gadariya community, those in the rural areas rear their own sheep and goats. A significant number of Chik are also involved in tanning of hides, with a small number now owning tanneries. A section of the Chik in Uttar Pradesh have now entered the transportation business, running trucks throughout the state.

Each settlement of the Chik contains an informal caste council, known as a panchayat. The panchayat is headed by a chaudhary. His duties include keeping a record of community members in the settlement. Traditionally, the panchayat deals with all intra community disputes, as well as traditionally punishing those who transgress community norms. The Chik are now also involved with the Anjuman Quraish, which is an India wide caste association of both the Chik and Qassab.

The Chik of Uttar Pradesh are strictly endogamous, and have a marked preference of marrying close kin. They speak Urdu, as well as local dialects such as Khari boli and Awadhi. The Chik are Sunni Muslims and are one of the more orthodox communities, incorporating fewer folk practices.  In terms of distribution, the Chik are found mainly in Rohilkhand and Awadh, with particular concentrations in the districts of Bareilly, Bijnor, Badaun, and Shahjahanpur in Rohilkhand, and Lucknow, Kheri, Unnao and Hardoi in Awadh.

The Chik of Bihar speak the Sadri dialect of Hindi. They are found throughout Bihar, and are one of the most widespread Muslim groups in that state. Their occupation remains the selling of meat, and this occupation is almost exclusive to this community. But many have now taken to other occupations, such as petty trade. The Anjuman Chik is one of the oldest caste association in Bihar, and have actively lobbied for the Chik.

References

Social groups of Uttar Pradesh
Muslim communities of Uttar Pradesh
Social groups of Bihar
Indian castes
Muslim communities of India
Muslim communities of Bihar